When Angels Fall, or Gdy spadają anioły, is a short film written and directed by Roman Polański in 1959. The idea for the film was taken from a short story "Klozet Babcia" (aka "Toilet Granny"), written by Leszek Szymański and published in the weekly "Kierunki" in Warsaw, Poland. The film was Polanski's first produced in color.

The film, told mostly in flashback, portrays a washroom attendant who reminisces about her former life while daydreaming at her dreary job.

(Note:The Polanski film is unrelated to the 1985 stage play When Angels Fall by Michael Jones and Linda Renye.)

References

Further reading

External links

1959 films
Films directed by Roman Polanski
Films with screenplays by Roman Polanski
Films scored by Krzysztof Komeda
Films based on short fiction
Polish short films